Keith Jon Hughes (born August 4, 1972) is a teacher, His YouTube channel has seen millions of views since starting in 2008. YouTube. Retrieved March 27, 2015.</ref> Hughes has been featured in a tv show.

Early life 
Hughes was raised in Putnam Valley, New York. In 1994, he moved to Buffalo to attend Buffalo State College where he received his undergraduate degree in Social Studies Education. Hughes went on to receive his master's degree in Educational Technology from the University of Buffalo in 2006.

Career

Teaching 
Hughes started teaching full-time in 1999 at McKinley High School; his focus was teaching U.S. History and Advanced Placement American Government. Shortly after the September 11 attacks, Hughes collaborated with his students on his first video, titled "Wings of Hope". The success of this project evolved into bringing in video production and media into his courses.

In the fall of 2014, Hughes started a new phase of his teaching career as a Technology Instructional Coach for the Buffalo Public School district, leaving the teaching role he had for the last 15 years.

YouTube personality 
On April 20, 2008. he started his educational YouTube Channel HipHughes History which focuses on government, politics and history.

References 

1972 births
Buffalo State College alumni
Living people
American YouTubers
People from Putnam County, New York
University at Buffalo alumni